Bufoceraurus is an extinct genus of trilobite.

References

Ordovician trilobites of North America
Cheiruridae
Phacopida genera